Nystactes may refer to:
 Nystactes (bird), a genus of birds in the family Bucconidae
 Nystactes, a genus of bats in the family Vespertilionidae, synonym of Myotis
 Nystactes, a genus of fishes in the family Congridae, synonym of Heteroconger